Publishing houses in the Soviet Union were a series of publishing enterprises which existed in the Soviet Union.

Centralization 
At its core was the former . Other union republics followed the same pattern.

During the era of centralization the names of the most publishers contained the acronym "" ("giz") standing for "" (i.e., "State Publisher", S.P.).

List

Early publishers 
As of 1 January 1930, there were 995 publishers in the RSFSR alone.

 «» (New Moscow)
 «» (Down with Illiteracy)
 «»
 «» (World Literature (Publishing House)) (1919–1924)

Period of centralization 
  (State Publishing House)
 «» (Land and Factory)
 «» (The Moscow Worker)
 «» (The Young Guard)
  (Great Soviet Encyclopedia)
 «» (The Worker for Enlightenment)
 
 
  (State Agriculture Publishing House)
 
 «» (The Atheist)
 «Academia»
 «» (Federation)
 «» (Nedra)
 
  (Publishing House of the Academy of Sciences of the USSR)
  (Publishing House of the Communist Academy)
  (Publishing House of the NKVD)
 
 OGIZ
  - stands for "State Publishing House for Children's Literature"
  (Publisher for Social-Economic Literature) -
  - stands for "State Publishing House of Student and Pedagogical Literature"
 
 
 
 
  -  (State Publishing House for Literary Works)
 
 
 
 
 
  (Lexicographic-Encyclopedic Publishing House)
 
 
  (Physical Culture and Tourism)
  (Publishing House for Party Literature)
 Renamed into 
  (Fizmatgiz/Физматгиз)
  (Nauka) (= Science)
  (RIA Novosti) - for news
  (Mir (= world) Publishers)
  (Progress Publishers)
  GTTI/ГТТИ
 Spin-offs of 
 , later decentralized into the  ONTI that included  GONTI:
  aka Государственное издательство технико-теоретической литературы ( (ГИТТЛ / GITTL) 
 
 
 
 
 etc.

Perestroika publishers 
  (RKP)
  (Izdatelstvo fiziko-matematicheskói i tejnicheskói literatury ) (1990–1998)

List of printing houses 
 «» (Polygraph Book)
 «» (Polygraph)

References

Further reading
 
 

 
Mass media companies of the Soviet Union
Soviet culture